WOTT is a 4-letter combination that can mean:

For the radio station, see WOTT (FM).
For the radio station that used the call sign from 1959 to 1982, see WNER.
For the series of adventure gamebooks set on the fantasy world of Orb, see Way of the Tiger.